Monkton may refer to:

Places
United Kingdom
Monkton, Devon, England
Monkton, Kent, England
Monkton, Pembroke, Wales
Monkton, South Ayrshire, Scotland
Monkton, Tyne and Wear, England
Monkton, Vale of Glamorgan, Wales

Canada
Monkton, Ontario

United States
Monkton, Maryland
Monkton, Vermont

People
 Edward Monkton

See also
Moncton (disambiguation)
Monckton (disambiguation)
Monkton, Brisbane, a heritage-listed house
Monkton House
Monkton Combe, Somerset, UK
Monkton Combe School, Somerset, UK
Monkton Farleigh, Wiltshire
Monkton Heathfield, Somerset
Bishop Monkton and Nun Monkton, North Yorkshire
West Monkton, Somerset
Winterborne Monkton, Dorset
Winterbourne Monkton, Wiltshire